Hiroyuki Nakamura (中村 ひろゆき, born February 23, 1961) is a Japanese politician who has served in the Japanese House of Representatives as a representative from the Hokkaido 4th district since 2012. He is a member of the Liberal Democratic Party.

References

1961 births
Living people
Japanese politicians